Pteroptochos is a genus of birds in the tapaculo family Rhinocryptidae.

Species
The genus contains the following three species:

References

 
Rhinocryptidae
Bird genera
Taxa named by Heinrich von Kittlitz
Taxonomy articles created by Polbot